The Boston mayoral election of 1880 saw  Frederick O. Prince reelected to his fourth overall term.

Results

See also
List of mayors of Boston, Massachusetts

References

Mayoral elections in Boston
Boston
Boston mayoral
19th century in Boston